Seymour Knox is the name of:
Seymour H. Knox I (1861–1915), entrepreneur of Woolworth's stores in Buffalo, NY
Seymour H. Knox II (1898–1990), art enthusiast from Buffalo, NY
 Portrait of Seymour H. Knox, by Andy Warhol, 1985
Seymour H. Knox III (1926–1996), hockey team owner from Buffalo, NY
Seymour M. Knox, member of the Wisconsin State Assembly

See also
 Knox (disambiguation)